Candace Kaye Bailey (born May 20, 1982) is an American actress and television personality best known as a co-host of the former television programs U-Pick Live on Nickelodeon and Attack of the Show! on G4.

Early life
Bailey was born in Birmingham, Alabama and relocated with her family to the Pensacola, Florida area at age two. At age 12, Bailey joined a New York City modeling company in the summer. Bailey graduated from Gulf Breeze High School of Gulf Breeze, Florida in 2001 and attended Marymount Manhattan College in New York City.

Career
Bailey is a former Junior Olympic gymnast.

In 1999, Bailey at age 17 made her on-screen debut on The Sopranos episode "Boca" as character Deena Hauser. While attending Marymount Manhattan, Bailey got her first television presenting job on the Nickelodeon children's show U-Pick Live in 2002 and would continue on the show until 2005 and she and her co-host Brent Popolizio formed a fictional band in the show called The Pickles, the name is from the Pickles Family characters in the animated series Rugrats. Bailey hosted an April Fools Day episode of Slime Time Live on Nickelodeon in 2003. In 2004, Bailey co-hosted a children-oriented Super Bowl XXXVIII pre-game show on Nickelodeon.

In her first role as a regular character in a fictional TV series, Bailey played Skylar Stevens on the CBS series Jericho from 2006 to 2008. In 2008, Bailey appeared in the music video of "Goodnight Goodnight" by Maroon 5. After Jericho was cancelled, Bailey worked as a cocktail waitress and babysitter between acting jobs. Bailey said that the work made her more appreciative of her acting opportunities.

Bailey returned to screen acting in a fifth season episode of Ghost Whisperer in 2010. On January 11, 2011, Bailey joined Kevin Pereira (who left the show on May 31, 2012) as the new co-host of Attack of the Show! and remained on the show until its then-final episode on January 23, 2013.

Filmography

Film

Television

Music videos

Video games

References

External links

1982 births
Living people
20th-century American actresses
21st-century American actresses
Actresses from Birmingham, Alabama
Actresses from Florida
American gymnasts
American soap opera actresses
American television actresses
American television hosts
American women television presenters
American voice actresses
American video game actresses
Marymount Manhattan College alumni
People from Pensacola, Florida